A modern torpedo is an underwater ranged weapon launched above or below the water surface, self-propelled towards a target, and with an explosive warhead designed to detonate either on contact with or in proximity to the target. Historically, such a device was called an automotive, automobile, locomotive, or fish torpedo; colloquially a fish.  The term torpedo originally applied to a variety of devices, most of which would today be called  mines. From about 1900, torpedo has been used strictly to designate a self-propelled underwater explosive device.

While the 19th-century battleship had evolved primarily with a view to engagements between armored warships with  large-caliber guns, the invention and refinement of torpedoes from the 1860s onwards allowed small torpedo boats and other lighter surface vessels, submarines/submersibles, even improvised fishing boats or frogmen, and later light aircraft, to destroy large ships without the need of large guns, though sometimes at the risk of being hit by longer-range artillery fire.
 
Modern torpedoes are classified variously as lightweight or heavyweight; straight-running, autonomous homers, and wire-guided types.  They can be launched from a variety of platforms. In modern warfare, a submarine-launched torpedo is almost certain to hit its target; the best defense is a counterattack using another torpedo.

Etymology
The word torpedo comes from the name of a genus of electric rays in the order Torpediniformes, which in turn comes from the Latin torpere ("to be stiff or numb").  In naval usage, the American Robert Fulton introduced the name to refer to a towed gunpowder charge used by his French submarine  (first tested in 1800) to demonstrate that it could sink warships.

History

Middle Ages 
Torpedo-like weapons were first proposed many centuries before they were successfully developed. For example, in 1275, Arab engineer Hasan al-Rammah – who worked as a military scientist for the Mamluk Sultanate of Egypt – wrote that it might be possible to create a projectile resembling "an egg", which propelled itself through water, whilst carrying "fire".

Early naval mines

In modern language, a "torpedo" is an underwater self-propelled explosive, but historically, the term also applied to primitive naval mines and spar torpedoes. These were used on an ad hoc basis during the early modern period up to the late 19th century.  

In the early 17th century, torpedoes were created by the Dutchman Cornelius Drebbel in the employ of King James I of England; he attached explosives to the end of a beam affixed to one of his submarines, now known as spar torpedoes, and they were used (to little effect) during the English expeditions to La Rochelle in 1626.

An early submarine, attempted to lay a bomb with a timed fuse on the hull of  during the American Revolutionary War, but failed in the attempt.

In the early 1800s, the American inventor Robert Fulton, while in France, "conceived the idea of destroying ships by introducing floating mines under their bottoms in submarine boats".  He coined the term "torpedo" about the explosive charges with which he outfitted his submarine Nautilus. However, both the French and the Dutch governments were uninterested in the submarine.  Fulton then concentrated on developing the torpedo-like weapon independent of a submarine deployment, and in 1804 succeeded in convincing the British government to employ his 'catamaran' against the French. An April 1804 torpedo attack on French ships anchored at Boulogne, and a follow-up attack in October, produced several explosions but no significant damage and the weapon was abandoned.

Fulton carried out a demonstration for the US government on 20 July 1807, destroying a vessel in New York's harbor.  Further development languished as Fulton focused on his "steam-boat matters".  During the War of 1812, naval mines were employed in attempts to destroy British vessels and protect American harbors.  A submarine-deployed floating mine was used in an unsuccessful attempt to destroy   while in New London's harbor.  This prompted the British Captain Hardy to warn the Americans to cease efforts with the use of any "torpedo boat" in this "cruel and unheard-of warfare", or he would "order every house near the shore to be destroyed".

Torpedoes were used by the Russian Empire during the Crimean War in 1855 against British warships in the Gulf of Finland. They used an early form of chemical detonator.
 
During the American Civil War, the term torpedo was used for what is today called a contact mine, floating on or below the water surface using an air-filled demijohn or similar flotation device. These devices were very primitive and apt to prematurely explode. They would be detonated on contact with the ship or after a set time, although electrical detonators were also occasionally used.  was the first warship to be sunk in 1862 by an electrically-detonated mine. These were used by the Confederate submarine  to sink  although the weapon was apt to cause as much harm to its user as to its target. Rear Admiral David Farragut's famous/apocryphal command during the Battle of Mobile Bay in 1864, "Damn the torpedoes, full speed ahead!" refers to a minefield laid at Mobile, Alabama.

On 26 May 1877, during the Romanian War of Independence, the Romanian spar torpedo boat  attacked and sank the Ottoman river monitor Seyfi. This was the first instance in history when a torpedo boat sank its targets without also sinking.

Invention of the modern torpedo

A prototype of the self-propelled torpedo was created on a commission placed by Giovanni Luppis, an Austro-Hungarian naval officer from Rijeka (modern-day Croatia), at the time a port city of the Austro-Hungarian Monarchy and Robert Whitehead, an English engineer who was the manager of a town factory. In 1864, Luppis presented Whitehead with the plans of the Salvacoste ("Coastsaver"), a floating weapon driven by ropes from the land that had been dismissed by the naval authorities due to the impractical steering and propulsion mechanisms.

In 1866, Whitehead invented the first effective self-propelled torpedo, the eponymous Whitehead torpedo, the first modern torpedo. French and German inventions followed closely, and the term torpedo came to describe self-propelled projectiles that traveled under or on water. By 1900, the term no longer included mines and booby-traps as the navies of the world added submarines, torpedo boats and torpedo boat destroyers to their fleets.

Whitehead was unable to improve the machine substantially, since the clockwork motor, attached ropes, and surface attack mode all contributed to a slow and cumbersome weapon. However, he kept considering the problem after the contract had finished, and eventually developed a tubular device, designed to run underwater on its own, and powered by compressed air. The result was a submarine weapon, the Minenschiff (mine ship), the first modern self-propelled torpedo, officially presented to the Austrian Imperial Naval commission on 21 December 1866.

The first trials were not successful as the weapon was unable to maintain a course at a steady depth. After much work, Whitehead introduced his "secret" in 1868 which overcame this. It was a mechanism consisting of a hydrostatic valve and pendulum that caused the torpedo's hydroplanes to be adjusted to maintain a preset depth.

Production and spread

After the Austrian government decided to invest in the invention, Whitehead started the first torpedo factory in Rijeka. The torpedo was powered by compressed air and had an explosive charge of gun-cotton.

Royal Navy (RN) representatives visited Rijeka for a demonstration in late 1869, and in 1870 a batch of torpedoes was ordered. In 1871, the British Admiralty paid Whitehead £15,000 for certain of his developments and production started at the Royal Laboratories in Woolwich the following year. In 1893, RN torpedo production was transferred to the Royal Gun Factory. These are now closed.

Whitehead opened a new factory near Portland Harbour, England, in 1890, which continued making torpedoes until the end of World War II. Because orders from the RN were not as large as expected, torpedoes were mostly exported. A series of devices was produced at Rijeka, with diameters from  upward. By 1881, nearly 1,500 torpedoes had been produced. Whitehead also opened a factory at St Tropez in 1890 that exported torpedoes to Brazil, The Netherlands, Turkey, and Greece.

Whitehead purchased rights to the gyroscope of Ludwig Obry in 1888 but it was not sufficiently accurate, so in 1890 he purchased a better design to improve control of his designs, which came to be called the "Devil's Device". The firm of L. Schwartzkopff in Germany also produced torpedoes and exported them to Russia, Japan, and Spain. In 1885, Britain ordered a batch of 50 as torpedo production at home and Rijeka could not meet demand.

By World War I, Whitehead's torpedo remained a worldwide success, and his company was able to maintain a monopoly on torpedo production.

Whitehead faced competition from the American Lieutenant Commander John A. Howell, whose  design, driven by a flywheel, was simpler and cheaper. It was produced from 1885 to 1895, and it ran straight, leaving no wake. A Torpedo Test Station was set up in Rhode Island in 1870. The Howell torpedo was the only United States Navy model until Whitehead torpedoes produced by Bliss and Williams entered service in 1894. Five varieties were produced, all 18-inch diameter. The United States Navy started using the Whitehead torpedo in 1892 after an American company, E.W. Bliss, secured manufacturing rights.

The Royal Navy introduced the Brotherhood wet heater engine in 1907 with the 18 in. Mk. VII & VII* which greatly increased the speed and/or range over compressed air engines and wet heater type engines became the standard in many major navies up to and during the Second World War.

Torpedo boats and guidance systems

Ships of the line were superseded by ironclads, large steam-powered ships with heavy gun armament and heavy armor, in the mid 19th century.

Although these ships were incredibly powerful, the new weight of armor slowed them down, and the huge guns needed to penetrate that armor fired at very slow rates. This allowed for the possibility of a small and fast ship that could attack the battleships, at a much lower cost. The introduction of the torpedo provided a weapon that could cripple, or sink, any battleship.

The first torpedo boats were built at the shipyards of Sir John Thornycroft and gained recognition for their effectiveness.

At the same time, inventors were working on building a guided torpedo. Prototypes were built by John Ericsson, John Louis Lay, and Victor von Scheliha, but the first practical guided missile was patented by Louis Brennan, an emigre to Australia, in 1877.

At night the mast had a small light, only visible from the rear. Two steel drums were mounted one behind the other inside the torpedo, each carrying several thousand yards of high-tensile steel wire. The drums connected via a differential gear to twin contra-rotating propellers. If one drum was rotated faster than the other, then the rudder was activated. The other ends of the wires were connected to steam-powered winding engines, which were arranged so that speeds could be varied within fine limits, giving sensitive steering control for the torpedo.

The torpedo was fitted with elevators controlled by a depth-keeping mechanism, and the fore and aft rudders operated by the differential between the drums.

Brennan traveled to Britain, where the Admiralty examined the torpedo and found it unsuitable for shipboard use. However, the War Office proved more amenable, and in early August 1881, a special Royal Engineer committee was instructed to inspect the torpedo at Chatham and report back directly to the Secretary of State for War, Hugh Childers. The report strongly recommended that an improved model be built at government expense. In 1883 an agreement was reached between the Brennan Torpedo Company and the government. The newly appointed Inspector-General of Fortifications in England, Sir Andrew Clarke, appreciated the value of the torpedo and in spring 1883 an experimental station was established at Garrison Point Fort, Sheerness, on the River Medway, and a workshop for Brennan was set up at the Chatham Barracks, the home of the Royal Engineers. Between 1883 and 1885 the Royal Engineers held trials and in 1886 the torpedo was recommended for adoption as a harbor defense torpedo. It was used throughout the British Empire for more than fifteen years.

Use in conflict

The Royal Navy frigate  was the first naval vessel to fire a self-propelled torpedo in anger during the Battle of Pacocha against rebel Peruvian ironclad  on 29 May 1877. The Peruvian ship successfully outran the device. On 16 January 1878, the Turkish steamer Intibah became the first vessel to be sunk by self-propelled torpedoes, launched from torpedo boats operating from the tender  under the command of Stepan Osipovich Makarov during the Russo-Turkish War of 1877–78. 

In another early use of the torpedo, during the War of the Pacific, the Peruvian ironclad Huáscar commanded by captain Miguel Grau attacked the Chilean corvette Abtao on 28 August 1879 at Antofagasta with a self-propelled Lay torpedo only to have it reverse course. The ship Huascar was saved when an officer jumped overboard to divert it.

The Chilean ironclad  was sunk on 23 April 1891 by a self-propelled torpedo from the Almirante Lynch, during the Chilean Civil War of 1891, becoming the first ironclad warship sunk by this weapon. The Chinese turret ship  was purportedly hit and disabled by a torpedo after numerous attacks by Japanese torpedo boats during the First Sino-Japanese War in 1894. At this time torpedo attacks were still very close range and very dangerous to the attackers.

Several western sources reported that the Qing dynasty Imperial Chinese military, under the direction of Li Hongzhang, acquired electric torpedoes, which they deployed in numerous waterways, along with fortresses and numerous other modern military weapons acquired by China. At the Tientsin Arsenal in 1876, the Chinese developed the capacity to manufacture these "electric torpedoes" on their own. Although a form of Chinese art, the Nianhua, depict such torpedoes being used against Russian ships during the Boxer Rebellion, whether they were actually used in battle against them is undocumented and unknown.

The Russo-Japanese War (1904–1905) was the first great war of the 20th century.  During the war the Imperial Russian and Imperial Japanese navies launched nearly 300 torpedoes at each other, all of them of the "self-propelled automotive" type.  The deployment of these new underwater weapons resulted in one battleship, two armored cruisers, and two destroyers being sunk in action, with the remainder of the roughly 80 warships being sunk by the more conventional methods of gunfire, mines, and scuttling.

On 27 May 1905, during the Battle of Tsushima, Admiral Rozhestvensky's flagship, the battleship , had been gunned to a wreck by Admiral Tōgō's 12-inch gunned battleline.  With the Russians sunk and scattering, Tōgō prepared for pursuit, and while doing so ordered his torpedo boat destroyers (TBDs) (mostly referred to as just destroyers in most written accounts) to finish off the Russian battleship. Knyaz Suvorov was set upon by 17 torpedo-firing warships, ten of which were destroyers and four torpedo boats. Twenty-one torpedoes were launched at the pre-dreadnought, and three struck home, one fired from the destroyer  and two from torpedo boats No. 72 and No. 75.  The flagship slipped under the waves shortly thereafter, taking over 900 men with her to the bottom. On December 9, 1912, the Greek submarine "Dolphin" launched a torpedo against the Ottoman cruiser "Medjidieh".

Aerial torpedo

The end of the Russo-Japanese War fuelled new theories, and the idea of dropping lightweight torpedoes from aircraft was conceived in the early 1910s by Bradley A. Fiske, an officer in the United States Navy. Awarded a patent in 1912, Fiske worked out the mechanics of carrying and releasing the aerial torpedo from a bomber, and defined tactics that included a night-time approach so that the target ship would be less able to defend itself. Fiske reported in 1915 that, using this method, enemy fleets could be attacked within their harbors if there was enough room for the torpedo track.

Meanwhile, the Royal Naval Air Service began actively experimenting with this possibility. The first successful aerial torpedo drop was performed by Gordon Bell in 1914 – dropping a Whitehead torpedo from a Short S.64 seaplane. The success of these experiments led to the construction of the first purpose-built operational torpedo aircraft, the Short Type 184, built-in 1915.

An order for ten aircraft was placed, and 936 aircraft were built by ten different British aircraft companies during the First World War. The two prototype aircraft were embarked upon , which sailed for the Aegean on 21 March 1915 to take part in the Gallipoli campaign.
On 12 August 1915 one of these, piloted by Flight Commander Charles Edmonds, was the first aircraft in the world to attack an enemy ship with an air-launched torpedo.

On 17 August 1915 Flight Commander Edmonds torpedoed and sank an Ottoman transport ship a few miles north of the Dardanelles. His formation colleague, Flight Lieutenant G B Dacre, was forced to land on the water owing to engine trouble but, seeing an enemy tug close by, taxied up to it and released his torpedo, sinking the tug. Without the weight of the torpedo Dacre was able to take off and return to Ben-My-Chree.

World War I

Torpedoes were widely used in World War I, both against shipping and against submarines. Germany disrupted the supply lines to Britain largely by use of submarine torpedoes, though submarines also extensively used guns. Britain and its allies also used torpedoes throughout the war. U-boats themselves were often targeted, twenty being sunk by torpedo. Two Royal Italian Navy torpedo boats scored a success against an Austrian-Hungarian squadron, sinking the battleship  with two torpedoes.

The Royal Navy had been experimenting with ways to further increase the range of torpedoes during World War 1 using pure oxygen instead of compressed air, this work ultimately leading to the development of the oxygen-enriched air 24.5 in. Mk. I intended originally for the s and  battleships of 1921, both being cancelled due to the Washington Naval Treaty. 

Initially, the Imperial Japanese Navy purchased Whitehead or Schwartzkopf torpedoes but by 1917, like the Royal Navy, they were conducting experiments with pure oxygen instead of compressed air. Because of explosions they abandoned the experiments but resumed them in 1926 and by 1933 had a working torpedo. They also used conventional  wet-heater torpedoes.

World War II 
In the inter-war years, financial stringency caused nearly all navies to skimp on testing their torpedoes. Only the British and Japanese had fully tested torpedoes (in particular the Type 93, nicknamed Long Lance postwar by the US official historian Samuel E. Morison)  at the start of World War II. Unreliable torpedoes caused many problems for the American submarine force in the early years of the war, primarily in the Pacific Theater. One possible exception to the pre-war neglect of torpedo development was the 45-cm caliber, 1931-premiered Japanese Type 91 torpedo, the sole aerial torpedo (Koku Gyorai) developed and brought into service by the Japanese Empire before the war. The Type 91 had an advanced PID controller and jettisonable, wooden  Kyoban aerial stabilizing surfaces which released upon entering the water, making it a formidable anti-ship weapon; Nazi Germany considered manufacturing it as the Luftorpedo LT 850 after August 1942.

The Royal Navy's 24.5-inch oxygen-enriched air torpedo saw service in the two  battleships although by World War II the use of enriched oxygen had been discontinued due to safety concerns. In the final phase of the action against ,  fired a pair of 24.5-inch torpedoes from her port-side tube and claimed one hit. According to Ludovic Kennedy, "if true, [this is] the only instance in history of one battleship torpedoing another". The Royal Navy continued the development of oxygen-enriched air torpedoes with the 21 in. Mk. VII of the 1920s designed for the s although once again these were converted to run on normal air at the start of World War II. Around this time too the Royal Navy were perfecting the Brotherhood burner cycle engine which offered a performance as good as the oxygen-enriched air engine but without the issues arising from the oxygen equipment and which was first used in the extremely successful and long-lived 21 in. Mk. VIII torpedo of 1925. This torpedo served throughout WW II (with 3,732 being fired by September 1944) and is still in limited service in the 21st Century. The improved Mark VIII** was used in two particularly notable incidents; on 6 February 1945 the only intentional wartime sinking of one submarine by another while both were submerged took place when HMS Venturer sank the German submarine U-864 with four Mark VIII** torpedoes and on 2 May 1982 when the Royal Navy submarine  sank the Argentine cruiser  with two Mark VIII** torpedoes during the Falklands War. This is the only sinking of a surface ship by a nuclear-powered submarine in wartime and the second (of three) sinkings of a surface ship by any submarine since the end of World War II).  The other two  sinkings were of the Indian frigate  and the South Korean corvette ROKS Cheonan.
 

Many classes of surface ships, submarines, and aircraft were armed with torpedoes. Naval strategy at the time was to use torpedoes, launched from submarines or warships, against enemy warships in a fleet action on the high seas.  There were concerns torpedoes would be ineffective against warships' heavy armor; an answer to this was to detonate torpedoes underneath a ship, badly damaging its keel and the other structural members in the hull, commonly called "breaking its back". This was demonstrated by magnetic influence mines in World War I. The torpedo would be set to run at a depth just beneath the ship, relying on a magnetic exploder to activate at the appropriate time.

Germany, Britain, and the U.S. independently devised ways to do this; German and American torpedoes, however, suffered problems with their depth-keeping mechanisms, coupled with faults in magnetic pistols shared by all designs. Inadequate testing had failed to reveal the effect of the Earth's magnetic field on ships and exploder mechanisms, which resulted in premature detonation. The Kriegsmarine and Royal Navy promptly identified and eliminated the problems. In the United States Navy (USN), there was an extended wrangle over the problems plaguing the Mark 14 torpedo (and its Mark 6 exploder). Cursory trials had allowed bad designs to enter service. Both the Navy Bureau of Ordnance and the United States Congress were too busy protecting their interests to correct the errors, and fully functioning torpedoes only became available to the USN twenty-one months into the Pacific War.

British submarines used torpedoes to interdict the Axis supply shipping to North Africa, while Fleet Air Arm Swordfish sank three Italian battleships at Taranto by a torpedo and (after a mistaken, but abortive, attack on ) scored one crucial hit in the hunt for the German battleship . Large tonnages of merchant shipping were sunk by submarines with torpedoes in both the Battle of the Atlantic and the Pacific War.

Torpedo boats, such as MTBs, PT boats, or S-boats, enabled the relatively small but fast craft to carry enough firepower, in theory, to destroy a larger ship, though this rarely occurred in practice. The largest warship sunk by torpedoes from small craft in World War II was the British cruiser , sunk by Italian MAS boats on the night of 12/13 August 1942 during Operation Pedestal. Destroyers of all navies were also armed with torpedoes to attack larger ships. In the Battle off Samar, destroyer torpedoes from the escorts of the American task force "Taffy 3" showed effectiveness at defeating armor. Damage and confusion caused by torpedo attacks were instrumental   in beating back a superior Japanese force of battleships and cruisers. In the Battle of the North Cape in December 1943, torpedo hits from British destroyers  and  slowed the German battleship  enough for the British battleship  to catch and sink her, and in May 1945 the British 26th Destroyer Flotilla (coincidentally led by Saumarez again) ambushed and sank Japanese heavy cruiser .

Frequency-hopping 

During World War II, Hedy Lamarr and composer George Antheil developed a radio guidance system for Allied torpedoes, it intended to use frequency-hopping  technology to defeat the threat of jamming by the Axis powers. As radio guidance had been abandoned some years earlier, it was not pursued. Although the US Navy never adopted the technology, it did, in the 1960s, investigate various spread-spectrum techniques. Spread-spectrum techniques are incorporated into Bluetooth technology and are similar to methods used in legacy versions of Wi-Fi. This work led to their induction into the National Inventors Hall of Fame in 2014.

Post–World War II 
Because of improved submarine strength and speed, torpedoes had to be given improved warheads and better motors. During the Cold War torpedoes were an important asset with the advent of nuclear-powered submarines, which did not have to surface often, particularly those carrying strategic nuclear missiles.

Several navies have launched torpedo strikes since World War II, including:
 During the Korean War the United States Navy successfully attacked a dam with air-launched torpedoes.
 Israeli Navy fast attack craft crippled the American electronic intelligence vessel USS Liberty with gunfire and torpedoes during the 1967 Six-Day War, resulting in the loss of 46 crew.
 A Pakistan Navy  sank the Indian frigate  on 9 December 1971 during the Indo-Pakistani War of 1971, with the loss of over 18 officers and 176 sailors.
 The British Royal Navy nuclear attack submarine  sank the Argentine Navy light cruiser  with two Mark 8 torpedoes during the Falklands War with the loss of 323 lives.
 During the Lebanon War, an unnamed Israeli submarine torpedoed and sank the Lebanese coaster Transit, which was carrying 56 Palestinian refugees to Cyprus, in the belief that the vessel was evacuating anti-Israeli militias. The ship was hit by two torpedoes, managed to run aground but eventually sank. There were 25 dead, including her captain. The Israeli Navy disclosed the incident in November 2018.
 The Croatian Navy disabled the Yugoslav patrol boat PČ-176 Mukos with a torpedo launched by Croatian naval commandos from an improvised device during the Battle of the Dalmatian channels on 14 November 1991, in the course of the Croatian War of Independence. Three members of the crew were killed. The stranded boat was later recovered by Croatian trawlers, salvaged and put in service with the Croatian Navy as OB-02 Šolta.
 On 26 March 2010 the South Korean Navy ship ROKS Cheonan was sunk with the loss of 46 personnel. A subsequent investigation concluded that the warship had been sunk by a North Korean torpedo fired by a midget submarine.

Energy sources

Compressed air
The Whitehead torpedo of 1866, the first successful self-propelled torpedo, used compressed air as its energy source. The speed and range of later models were improved by increasing the pressure of the stored air.

At higher pressures the adiabatic cooling, experienced by the air as it expanded in the engine caused icing problems. This drawback was remedied by heating the air with seawater before it was fed to the engine, which increased engine performance further because the air expanded even more after heating. This was the principle used by the Brotherhood engine.

Heated torpedoes
Passing the air through an engine led to the idea of injecting a liquid fuel, like kerosene, into the air and igniting it. In this manner, the air is heated more and expands even further, and the burned propellant adds more gas to drive the engine. Construction of such heated torpedoes started circa 1904 by Whitehead's company.

Wet-heater
 
A further improvement was the use of water to cool the combustion chamber of the fuel-burning torpedo. This not only solved heating problems so more fuel could be burned but also allowed additional power to be generated by feeding the resulting steam into the engine together with the combustion products. Torpedoes with such a propulsion system became known as wet heaters, while heated torpedoes without steam generation were retrospectively called dry heaters. A simpler system was introduced by the British Royal Gun factory in 1908. Most torpedoes used in World War I and World War II were wet-heaters.

Compressed oxygen 
The amount of fuel that can be burned by a torpedo engine (i.e. wet engine) is limited by the amount of oxygen it can carry. Since compressed air contains only about 21% oxygen, engineers in Japan developed the Type 93 (nicknamed "Long Lance" postwar) for destroyers and cruisers in the 1930s. It used pure compressed oxygen instead of compressed air and had performance unmatched by any contemporary torpedo in service, through the end of World War II. However, oxygen systems posed a danger to any ship that came under attack while still carrying such torpedoes; Japan lost several cruisers partly due to catastrophic secondary explosions of Type 93s. During the war, Germany experimented with hydrogen peroxide for the same purpose.

Oxygen enriched air 
The British approached the problem of providing additional oxygen for the torpedo engine by the use of oxygen-enriched air, up to 57% instead of the 21% of normal atmospheric compressed air rather than pure oxygen. There was a general nervousness about the oxygen enrichment equipment, known for reasons of secrecy as 'No 1 Air Compressor Room' on board ships, and development shifted to the highly efficient Brotherhood Burner Cycle engine that used un-enriched air.

Burner cycle engine 
After the First World War Brotherhood developed a 4 cylinder burner cycle engine which was roughly twice as powerful as the older wet heater engine. It was first used in the British Mk VIII torpedoes, which were still in service in 1982. It used a modified diesel cycle, using a small amount of paraffin to heat the incoming air, which was then compressed and further heated by the piston, and then more fuel was injected. It produced about 322 hp when introduced, but by the end of WW2 was at 465 hp, and there was a proposal to fuel it with nitric acid when it was projected to develop 750 hp.

Wire driven

The Brennan torpedo had two wires wound around internal drums. Shore-based steam winches pulled the wires, which spun the drums and drove the propellers. An operator controlled the relative speeds of the winches, providing guidance. Such systems were used for coastal defense of the British homeland and colonies from 1887 to 1903 and were purchased by, and under the control of, the Army as opposed to the Navy.

Flywheel
The Howell torpedo used by the US Navy in the late 19th century featured a heavy flywheel that had to be spun up before launch. The Howell had the advantage of not leaving a trail of bubbles behind it, unlike compressed air torpedoes. This gave the target vessel less chance to detect and evade the torpedo and avoided giving away the attacker's position. Additionally, it ran at a constant depth, unlike Whitehead models.

Electric batteries

Electric propulsion systems avoided tell-tale bubbles. John Ericsson invented an electrically propelled torpedo in 1873; it was powered by a cable from an external power source, because batteries of the time had insufficient capacity. The Sims-Edison torpedo was similarly powered. The Nordfelt torpedo was also electrically powered and was steered by impulses down a trailing wire.

Germany introduced its first battery-powered torpedo shortly before World War II, the G7e. It was slower and had a shorter range than the conventional G7a, but was wakeless and much cheaper. Its lead-acid rechargeable battery was sensitive to shock, required frequent maintenance before use, and required preheating for best performance. The experimental G7es, an enhancement of the G7e, used primary cells.

The United States had an electric design, the Mark 18, largely copied from the German torpedo (although with improved batteries), as well as FIDO, an air-dropped acoustic homing torpedo for anti-submarine use.

Modern electric torpedoes such as the Mark 24 Tigerfish, the Black Shark or DM2 series commonly use silver oxide batteries that need no maintenance, so torpedoes can be stored for years without losing performance.

Rockets
Several experimental rocket-propelled torpedoes were tried soon after Whitehead's invention but were not successful. Rocket propulsion has been implemented successfully by the Soviet Union, for example in the VA-111 Shkval—and has been recently revived in Russian and German torpedoes, as it is especially suitable for supercavitating devices.

Modern energy sources
Modern torpedoes use a variety of propellants, including electric batteries (as with the French F21 torpedo or Italian Black Shark), monopropellants (e.g., Otto fuel II as with the US Mark 48 torpedo), and bipropellants (e.g., hydrogen peroxide plus kerosene as with the Swedish Torped 62, sulfur hexafluoride plus lithium as with the US Mark 50 torpedo, or Otto fuel II plus hydroxyl ammonium perchlorate as with the British Spearfish torpedo).

Propulsion
The first of Whitehead's torpedoes had a single propeller and needed a large vane to stop it spinning about its longitudinal axis. Not long afterward the idea of contra-rotating propellers was introduced, to avoid the need for the vane. The three-bladed propeller came in 1893 and the four-bladed one in 1897. To minimize noise, today's torpedoes often use pump-jets.

Torpedoes that don't use supercavitation, such as the American Mark 48 and British Spearfish, are limited to under , though manufacturers and the military don't always release exact figures.

Guidance

Torpedoes may be aimed at the target and fired unguided, similarly to a traditional artillery shell, or they may be guided onto the target. They may be guided automatically towards the target by some procedure, e.g., sound (homing), or by the operator, typically via commands sent over a signal-carrying cable (wire guidance).

Unguided
The Victorian era Brennan torpedo could be steered onto its target by varying the relative speeds of its propulsion cables. However, the Brennan required a substantial infrastructure and was not suitable for shipboard use. Therefore, for the first part of its history, the torpedo was guided only in the sense that its course could be regulated to achieve an intended impact depth (because of the sine wave running path of the Whitehead, this was a hit or miss proposition, even when everything worked correctly) and, through gyroscopes, a straight course. With such torpedoes the method of attack in small torpedo boats, torpedo bombers and small submarines was to steer a predictable collision course abeam to the target and release the torpedo at the last minute, then veer away, all the time subject to defensive fire.

In larger ships and submarines, fire control calculators gave a wider engagement envelope. Originally, plotting tables (in large ships), combined with specialized slide rules (known in U.S. service as the "banjo" and "Is/Was"), reconciled the speed, distance, and course of a target with the firing ship's speed and course, together with the performance of its torpedoes, to provide a firing solution. By the Second World War, all sides had developed automatic electro-mechanical calculators, exemplified by the U.S. Navy's Torpedo Data Computer. Submarine commanders were still expected to be able to calculate a firing solution by hand as a backup against mechanical failure, and because many submarines existed at the start of the war were not equipped with a TDC; most could keep the "picture" in their heads and do much of the calculations (simple trigonometry) mentally, from extensive training.

Against high-value targets and multiple targets, submarines would launch a spread of torpedoes, to increase the probability of success. Similarly, squadrons of torpedo boats and torpedo bombers would attack together, creating a "fan" of torpedoes across the target's course. Faced with such an attack, the prudent thing for a target to do was to turn to parallel the course of the incoming torpedo and steam away from the torpedoes and the firer, allowing the relatively short-range torpedoes to use up their fuel. An alternative was to "comb the tracks", turning to parallel the incoming torpedo's course, but turning towards the torpedoes. The intention of such a tactic was still to minimize the size of the target offered to the torpedoes, but at the same time be able to aggressively engage the firer. This was the tactic advocated by critics of Jellicoe's actions at Jutland, his caution at turning away from the torpedoes being seen as the reason the Germans escaped.

The use of multiple torpedoes to engage single targets depletes torpedo supplies and greatly reduces a submarine's combat endurance. Endurance can be improved by ensuring a target can be effectively engaged by a single torpedo, which gave rise to the guided torpedo.

Pattern running

In World War II the Germans introduced programmable pattern-running torpedoes, which would run a predetermined pattern until they either ran out of fuel or hit something. The earlier version, FaT, ran out after launch in a straight line, and then weaved backward and forwards parallel to that initial course, whilst the more advanced LuT could transit to a different angle after launch, and then enter a more complex weaving pattern.

Radio and wire guidance

Though Luppis' original design had been rope-guided, torpedoes were not wire-guided until the 1960s.

During the First World War the U.S. Navy evaluated a radio controlled torpedo launched from a surface ship called the Hammond Torpedo.

Modern torpedoes use an umbilical wire, which nowadays allows the computer processing power of the submarine or ship to be used. Torpedoes such as the U.S. Mark 48 can operate in a variety of modes, increasing tactical flexibility.

Homing

Homing "fire and forget" torpedoes can use passive or active guidance or a combination of both. Passive acoustic torpedoes home in on emissions from a target. Active acoustic torpedoes home in on the reflection of a signal, or "ping", from the torpedo or its parent vehicle; this has the disadvantage of giving away the presence of the torpedo. In semi-active mode, a torpedo can be fired to the last known position or calculated position of a target, which is then acoustically illuminated ("pinged") once the torpedo is within attack range.

Later in the Second World War torpedoes were given acoustic (homing) guidance systems, with the American Mark 24 mine and Mark 27 torpedo and the German G7es torpedo. Pattern-following and wake homing torpedoes were also developed. Acoustic homing formed the basis for torpedo guidance after the Second World War.

The homing systems for torpedoes are generally acoustic, though there have been other target sensor types used. A ship's acoustic signature is not the only emission a torpedo can home in on; to engage U.S. supercarriers, the Soviet Union developed the 53–65 wake-homing torpedo. As standard acoustic lures can't distract a wake homing torpedo, the US Navy has installed the Surface Ship Torpedo Defense on aircraft carriers that use a Countermeasure Anti-Torpedo to home in on and destroy the attacking torpedo.

Warhead and fuzing
The warhead is generally some form of aluminized explosive, because the sustained explosive pulse produced by the powdered aluminum is particularly destructive against underwater targets. Torpex was popular until the 1950s, but has been superseded by PBX compositions. Nuclear torpedoes have also been developed, e.g. the Mark 45 torpedo. In lightweight antisubmarine torpedoes designed to penetrate submarine hulls, a shaped charge can be used. Detonation can be triggered by direct contact with the target or by a proximity fuze incorporating sonar and/or magnetic sensors.

Contact detonation
When a torpedo with a contact fuze strikes the side of the target hull, the resulting explosion creates a bubble of expanding gas, the walls of which move faster than the speed of sound in water, thus creating a shock wave. The side of the bubble which is against the hull rips away the external plating creating a large breach. The bubble then collapses in on itself, forcing a high-speed stream of water into the breach which can destroy bulkheads and machinery in its path.

Proximity detonation
A torpedo fitted with a proximity fuze can be detonated directly under the keel of a target ship. The explosion creates a gas bubble which may damage the keel or underside plating of the target. However, the most destructive part of the explosion is the upthrust of the gas bubble, which will bodily lift the hull in the water. The structure of the hull is designed to resist downward rather than upward pressure, causing severe strain in this phase of the explosion. When the gas bubble collapses, the hull will tend to fall into the void in the water, creating a sagging effect. Finally, the weakened hull will be hit by the uprush of water caused by the collapsing gas bubble, causing structural failure. On vessels up to the size of a modern frigate, this can result in the ship breaking in two and sinking. This effect is likely to prove less catastrophic on a much larger hull, for instance, that of an aircraft carrier.

Damage
The damage that may be caused by a torpedo depends on the "shock factor value", a combination of the initial strength of the explosion and the distance between the target and the detonation. When taken about ship hull plating, the term "hull shock factor" (HSF) is used, while keel damage is termed "keel shock factor" (KSF). If the explosion is directly underneath the keel, then HSF is equal to KSF, but explosions that are not directly underneath the ship will have a lower value of KSF.

Direct damage
Usually only created by contact detonation, direct damage is a hole blown in the ship. Among the crew, fragmentation wounds are the most common form of injury. Flooding typically occurs in one or two main watertight compartments, which can sink smaller ships or disable larger ones.

Bubble jet effect
The bubble jet effect occurs when a mine or torpedo detonates in the water a short distance away from the targeted ship. The explosion creates a bubble in the water, and due to the pressure difference, the bubble will collapse from the bottom. The bubble is buoyant, and so it rises towards the surface. If the bubble reaches the surface as it collapses, it can create a pillar of water that can go over a hundred meters into the air (a "columnar plume"). If conditions are right and the bubble collapses onto the ship's hull, the damage to the ship can be extremely serious; the collapsing bubble forms a high-energy jet that can break a meter-wide hole straight through the ship, flooding one or more compartments, and is capable of breaking smaller ships apart. The crew in the areas hit by the pillar are usually killed instantly. Other damage is usually limited.

The Baengnyeong incident, in which  broke in half and sank off the coast South Korea in 2010, was caused by the bubble jet effect, according to an international investigation.

Shock effect
If the torpedo detonates at a distance from the ship, and especially under the keel, the change in water pressure causes the ship to resonate. This is frequently the most deadly type of explosion if it is strong enough. The whole ship is dangerously shaken and everything on board is tossed around. Engines rip from their beds, cables from their holders, etc. A badly shaken ship usually sinks quickly, with hundreds, or even thousands of small leaks all over the ship and no way to power the pumps. The crew fares no better, as the violent shaking tosses them around. This shaking is powerful enough to cause disabling injury to knees and other joints in the body, particularly if the affected person stands on surfaces connected directly to the hull (such as steel decks).

The resulting gas cavitation and shock-front-differential over the width of the human body is sufficient to stun or kill divers.

Control surfaces and hydrodynamics
Control surfaces are essential for a torpedo to maintain its course and depth. A homing torpedo also needs to be able to outmaneuver a target. Good hydrodynamics are needed for it to attain high speed efficiently and also to give a long range since the torpedo has limited stored energy.

Launch platforms and launchers 

Torpedoes may be launched from submarines, surface ships, helicopters and fixed-wing aircraft, unmanned naval mines and naval fortresses. They are also used in conjunction with other weapons; for example, the Mark 46 torpedo used by the United States is the warhead section of the ASROC (Anti-Submarine ROCket) and the CAPTOR mine (CAPsulated TORpedo) is a submerged sensor platform which releases a torpedo when a hostile contact is detected.

Ships

Originally, Whitehead torpedoes were intended for launch underwater and the firm was upset when they found out the British were launching them above water, as they considered their torpedoes too delicate for this. However, the torpedoes survived. The launch tubes could be fitted in a ship's bow, which weakened it for ramming, or on the broadside; this introduced problems because of water flow twisting the torpedo, so guide rails and sleeves were used to prevent it. The torpedoes were originally ejected from the tubes by compressed air but later slow-burning gunpowder was used. Torpedo boats originally used a frame that dropped the torpedo into the sea. Royal Navy Coastal Motor Boats of World War I used a rear-facing trough and a cordite ram to push the torpedoes into the water tail-first; they then had to move rapidly out of the way to avoid being hit by their torpedo.

Developed in the run-up to the First World War, multiple-tube mounts (initially twin, later triple and in WW2 up to quintuple in some ships) for  torpedoes in rotating turntable mounts appeared. Destroyers could be found with two or three of these mounts with between five and twelve tubes in total. The Japanese went one better, covering their tube mounts with splinter protection and adding reloading gear (both unlike any other navy in the world), making them true turrets and increasing the broadside without adding tubes and top hamper (as the quadruple and quintuple mounts did). Considering that their Type 93s were very effective weapons, the IJN equipped their cruisers with torpedoes. The Germans also equipped their capital ships with torpedoes.

Smaller vessels such as PT boats carried their torpedoes in fixed deck-mounted tubes using compressed air. These were either aligned to fire forward or at an offset angle from the centerline.

Later, lightweight mounts for  homing torpedoes were developed for anti-submarine use consisting of triple launch tubes used on the decks of ships. These were the 1960 Mk 32 torpedo launcher in the US and part of STWS (Shipborne Torpedo Weapon System) in the UK. Later a below-decks launcher was used by the RN. This basic launch system continues to be used today with improved torpedoes and fire control systems.

Submarines
Modern submarines use either swim-out systems or a pulse of water to discharge the torpedo from the tube, both of which have the advantage of being significantly quieter than previous systems, helping avoid detection of the firing from passive sonar. Earlier designs used a pulse of compressed air or a hydraulic ram.

Early submarines, when they carried torpedoes, were fitted with a variety of torpedo launching mechanisms in a range of locations; on the deck, in the bow or stern, amidships, with some launch mechanisms permitting the torpedo to be aimed over a wide arc. By World War II, designs favored multiple bow tubes and fewer or no stern tubes. Modern submarine bows are usually occupied by a large sonar array, necessitating midships tubes angled outward, while stern tubes have largely disappeared. The first French and Russian submarines carried their torpedoes externally in Drzewiecki drop collars. These were cheaper than tubes but less reliable. Both the United Kingdom and the United States experimented with external tubes in World War II. External tubes offered a cheap and easy way of increasing torpedo capacity without radical redesign, something neither had time or resources to do before nor early in, the war. British T-class submarines carried up to 13 torpedo tubes, up to 5 of them external.  America's use was mainly limited to earlier Porpoise-, -, and -class boats. Until the appearance of the  class, most American submarines only carried 4 bow and either 2 or 4 stern tubes, something many American submarine officers felt provided inadequate firepower.  This problem was compounded by the notorious unreliability of the Mark 14 torpedo.

Late in World War II, the U.S. adopted a  homing torpedo (known as "Cutie") for use against escorts. It was basically a modified Mark 24 Mine with wooden rails to allow firing from a  torpedo tube.

Air launch

Aerial torpedoes may be carried by fixed-wing aircraft, helicopters, or missiles. They are launched from the first two at prescribed speeds and altitudes, dropped from bomb-bays or underwing hardpoints.

Handling equipment 
Although lightweight torpedoes are fairly easily handled, the transport and handling of heavyweight torpedoes is difficult, especially in the tight spaces in a submarine. After the Second World War, some Type XXI submarines were obtained from Germany by the United States and Britain. One of the main novel developments seen was a mechanical handling system for torpedoes. Such systems were widely adopted as a result of this discovery.

Classes and diameters 

Torpedoes are launched in several ways:
From a torpedo tube mounted either in a trainable deck mount (common in destroyers), or fixed above or below the waterline of a surface vessel (as in cruisers, battleships, and armed merchant cruisers) or submarine.
Early submarines and some torpedo boats (such as the U.S. World War II PT boats, which used the Mark 13 aircraft torpedo) used deck-mounted "drop collars", which simply relied on gravity.
From shackles aboard low-flying aircraft or helicopters.
As the final stage of a compound rocket or ramjet powered munition (sometimes called an assisted torpedo).

Many navies have two weights of torpedoes:
A light torpedo used primarily as a close attack weapon, particularly by aircraft.
A heavy torpedo used primarily as a standoff weapon, particularly by submerged submarines.

In the case of deck or tube launched torpedoes, the diameter of the torpedo is a key factor in determining the suitability of a particular torpedo to a tube or launcher, similar to the caliber of the gun. The size is not quite as critical as for a gun, but the diameter has become the most common way of classifying torpedoes.

Length, weight, and other factors also contribute to compatibility. In the case of aircraft launched torpedoes, the key factors are weight, provision of suitable attachment points, and launch speed. Assisted torpedoes are the most recent development in torpedo design, and are normally engineered as an integrated package. Versions for aircraft and assisted launching have sometimes been based on deck or tube launched versions, and there has been at least one case of a submarine torpedo tube being designed to fire an aircraft torpedo.

As in all munition design, there is a compromise between standardization, which simplifies manufacture, and logistics, and specialization, which may make the weapon significantly more effective. Small improvements in either logistics or effectiveness can translate into enormous operational advantages.

Use by various navies

French Navy

German Navy
Modern German Navy:

 DM2A4 heavyweight torpedo
 DM2A3 heavyweight torpedo
 MU 90 lightweight impact torpedo
Mark 46 torpedo
 Barracuda (supercavitating torpedo)

The torpedoes used by the World War II Kriegsmarine included:

 G7a(TI)
 G7e(TII)
 G7e(TIII)
 G7s(TIV) "Falke"
 G7s(TV) "Zaunkönig"

Armed Forces of the Islamic Republic of Iran
Islamic Republic of Iran Navy
 Type 53 torpedo
 TEST-71 torpedo
 Valfajr torpeo

Islamic Revolution Guard Corps Navy:
 Hoot torpedo

Italian Navy
The Italian Navy uses two types of heavyweight torpedoes, both developed and produced by Leonardo:
 A-184 torpedo on the Sauro-class submarines
 Black Shark torpedo on the Todaro-class submarines

Imperial Japanese Navy
The torpedoes used by the Imperial Japanese Navy (World War II) included:
 Type 91 torpedo
 Type 92 torpedo
 Type 93 torpedo (Long Lance)
 Type 95 torpedo
 Type 97 torpedo
 Kaiten

Japan Maritime Self-Defense Force
Modern Japan Maritime Self-Defense Force:
 Type 72 torpedo
 Type 73 light weight torpedo
 Type 80 torpedo (G-RX1)
 Type 89 torpedo (G-RX2)
 Type 97 light weight torpedo (G-RX4)
 Type 12 light weight torpedo (G-RX5)

Indian Navy

 Takshak (heavy weight torpedo)
 Varunastra (heavyweight torpedo)
 Advanced Light Torpedo Shyena
 S.M.A.R.T.

Royal Canadian Navy
Torpedoes used by the Royal Canadian Navy include:
 MK-48 Mod 7 Advanced Technology (AT) Torpedo

Royal Navy
The torpedoes used by the Royal Navy include:
 Spearfish torpedo
 Stingray torpedo
 Tigerfish
 Mark 8, designed in 1925, last used in action in 1982

Russian Navy
Torpedoes used by the Russian Navy include:
 Type 53 torpedo
 Type 65 torpedo
 APR-3E torpedo
 VA-111 Shkval torpedo
 65-76A 100 km

In April 2015, the Fizik (UGST) heat-seeking torpedo entered service to replace the wake-homing USET-80 developed in the 1980s and the next-gen Futlyar entered service in 2017.

U.S. Navy
The major torpedoes in the United States Navy inventory are:
 the Mark 46 lightweight
 the Mark 48 heavyweight torpedo
 the Mark 50 advanced lightweight
 the Mark 54 Lightweight Hybrid Torpedo
 the Mark 60 Encapsulated Torpedo (CAPTOR), a moored anti-submarine mine that releases a torpedo as its warhead

South Korean Navy
Torpedoes used by the Republic of Korea Navy include:
 Baek Sang Eo (White Shark) heavyweight torpedo
 Chung Sang Eo (Blue Shark) lightweight torpedo
 Hong Sang Eo (Red Shark) homing torpedo
 Beom Sang Eo (Tiger Shark) heavyweight torpedo

See also
 Anti-submarine weapon
 Autonomous Underwater Vehicle
 Bangalore torpedo
 Human torpedo
 List of torpedoes
 Missile guidance
 Nuclear torpedo
 André Rebouças, who supposedly developed a torpedo in the Paraguayan War (1864–1870)
 Shock factor
 Torpedo defence

Footnotes

References 
 
 
 
 The Columbia Encyclopedia, Sixth Edition, online.
 
 
 
 
 
 
 
 
 
 
 
 
 
 
 Attribution

External links

 "Modern Torpedoes And Countermeasures", by Austin Joseph, Bharat Rakshak Monitor, Volume 3(4) January–February 2001.
 Navy Fact File Torpedoes: Mark 46, Mark 48, Mark 50, the source of the US Navy torpedo data (via the Internet Archive)
 The US Navy – Fact File: Torpedo – Mark 46 
 The US Navy – Fact File: Heavyweight Torpedo – Mark 48 
 The US Navy – Fact File: Torpedo – Mark 50 
 The US Navy – Fact File: Torpedo – Mark 54 
 "A History of the Torpedo The Early Days"
 "Torpedo History" Geoff Kirby (1972)
 "Development of Rocket Torpedoes" Geoff Kirby (2000)
 Torpedo Display, US Naval Undersea Museum
 Torpedo Collection, US Naval Undersea Museum
 Super Cavitation Torpedo 'Barracuda' 
 1890-07-26: THE SIMS – EDISON ELECTRIC TORPEDO – THE TORPEDO AT FULL SPEED – SECTIONAL VIEW OF THE TORPEDO
 "Our New Torpedo Bombers to Batter the Axis", Popular Science, September 1942; illustration at bottom of page 94 shows how Whitehead's so-called "secret unit" (i.e., the Pendulum mechanism) kept a torpedo level after entering the water, which made the self-propelled torpedo possible
 "Torture Test for Tin Fishes"—August 1944 Popular Mechanics article on testing US torpedoes – detailed photos

 
Ammunition
Anti-submarine warfare
Anti-submarine weapons
Projectiles
Unmanned underwater vehicles